The Rollin Motors Company was an American automobile manufacturer from 1923 until 1925 and founded by Rollin Henry White. The company was based in Cleveland, Ohio.

History 
The Rollin automobile had advanced technology, brakes on all four wheels (mechanical internal expanding type), pistons and connecting rods of special aluminum, lubrication oil through a pump and a four-bearing crankshaft.  There were four models: Touring ($995), Brougham, Sedan and 3 passenger Coupe($1,175). Cars were sold in the USA, Australia and a very few to Europe. Designed and built by Rollin H. White, formerly chief engineer of the White Motor Company.

The car was planned as an economical automobile to capture a share of the lower price market.  Its engine was similar to that of the Cletrac tractor, a White subsidiary. The chairman was Rollin Henry White. His father, Thomas White, was chairman of The White Sewing Machine Company, and the White Motor Company.  The Rollin was too high-priced for the market for which it had been intended.  In its most successful year, 1924, approximately 3,622 units were produced.  By the end of 1925 the factory was closed due to bankruptcy.

In December 1924 the car carrier SS Lakeland transported on Lake Michigan several new automobiles. The Lakeland sank with at least twenty-two model-year vehicles aboard from Nash Motors, Kissel Motor Car Company, and a Rollin. Recreational divers recovered the Rollin automobile in 1979 but it was too damaged to save.

As of 2018, there are several Rollin automobiles in the USA and in Australia, as well as a few in Europe, at least one in the Netherlands and two in Sweden.

In 2023 the Rollin Preservation Society (NL) presented a documentary about an unique still on public road admitted Rollin.Keep Rollin - the documentary

Gallery

Bibliography

References 

]== External links ==
 Automotive Hall of Fame
 Western Reserve Historical Society — Cleveland History Center, 2 Rollin automobiles
 2 Rollin Model G's at ConceptCarz
  https://youtube.com/watch?v=sOPsYtEJeKY/ documentary Keep Rollin

Defunct motor vehicle manufacturers of the United States
Motor vehicle manufacturers based in Ohio
Defunct companies based in Cleveland
1923 establishments in Ohio
Vehicle manufacturing companies established in 1923
Vehicle manufacturing companies disestablished in 1925
1925 disestablishments in the United States
Vintage vehicles
1920s cars
Cars introduced in 1923